Sarband is a village in Rahdar Rural District, in the Central District of Rudan County, Hormozgan Province, Iran. At the 2006 census, its population was 34, in 9 families.

References 

Populated places in Rudan County